Amácio Mazzaropi (São Paulo, April 9, 1912 – São Paulo, June 13, 1981) was a Brazilian actor and filmmaker.

Biography
A comic performer from a circus background, he became popular in Brazil with his character Jeca Tatu, a portrayal of the rural caipira. Mazzaropi debuted in cinema in 1951, with Sai da Frente. In 1958 he established his own film studio, PAM Filmes, producing and distributing his own movies.

He died in São Paulo on June 13, 1981, of bone marrow cancer.

Tribute
On April 9, 2021, Google celebrated his 109th birthday with a Google Doodle.

Filmography

 Sai da frente (1952) as Isidoro Colepicola
 Nadando em dinheiro (1952) as Isidoro Colepícula
 Candinho (1954) as Candinho
 A Carrocinha (1955) as Jacinto
 Fuzileiro do Amor (1956) as José Ambrósio / Ambrósio José
 Chico Fumaça (1956) as Chico Fumaça
 O Gato de Madame (1957) as Arlindo Pinto
 O Noivo da Girafa (1958) as Aparício
 Chofer de Praça (1959) as Zacarias
 Zé do Periquito (1960) as Zenó, o Zé do Periquito
 Jeca Tatu (1960) as Jeca
 As Aventuras de Pedro Malasartes (1960) as Pedro Malazartes
 Tristeza do Jeca (1961) as Jeca
 O Vendedor de Linguiça (1962) as Gustavo
 Casinha Pequenina (1963) as Chico
 O Lamparina (1964) as Bernardino Jabá
 O puritano da rua Augusta (1965) as Punduroso
 Meu Japão Brasileiro (1965) as Fofuca
 O corintiano (1967) as Manoel (Seu Mané)
 O Jeca e a freira (1968) as Sigismundo, o Jeca
 Uma pistola para Djeca (1969) as Gumercindo
 No paraíso das solteironas (1969) as Joaquim Kabrito / J.K.
 Betão Ronca Ferro (1971) as Betão
 O grande xerife (1972) as Inácio Pororoca
 Um caipira em Bariloche (1973) as Polidoro
 Portugal, minha saudade (1974) as Sabino
 O Cineasta das Platéias (1975) 
 O jeca macumbeiro (1975) as Pirola
 Jeca contra o Capeta (1976) as Poluído
 Jecão...um fofoqueiro no céu (1977) as Jecão
 O Jeca e seu filho preto (1978) as Zé
 A Banda das Velhas Virgens (1979) as Gostoso
 O Jeca e a égua milagrosa (1980) as Raimundo
 Maria Tomba Homem - (not finished)

References

External links
 A virtual museum about Mazzaropi
More about Mazzaropi

Brazilian film directors
Brazilian people of Italian descent
1912 births
1981 deaths
20th-century Brazilian male actors
Deaths from cancer in São Paulo (state)